Leslie Thornton may refer to:

Leslie Thornton (filmmaker) (born 1951), American filmmaker
Leslie Thornton (sculptor) (1925–2016), British sculptor